Philip Starr "Phil" Wolfe (August 11, 1927 – December 29, 2016) was an American mathematician and one of the founders of convex optimization theory and mathematical programming.

Life
Wolfe received his bachelor's degree, masters, and Ph.D. degrees from the University of California, Berkeley. He and his wife, Hallie, lived in Ossining, New York.

Career
In 1954, he was offered an instructorship at Princeton, where he worked on generalizations of linear programming, such as quadratic programming and general non-linear programming, leading to the Frank–Wolfe algorithm in joint work with Marguerite Frank, then a visitor at Princeton. When Maurice Sion was on sabbatical at the Institute for Advanced Study, Sion and Wolfe published in 1957 an example of a zero-sum game without a minimax value.
Wolfe joined RAND corporation in 1957, where he worked with George Dantzig, resulting in the now well known Dantzig–Wolfe decomposition method.
In 1965, he moved to IBM's Thomas J. Watson Research Center in Yorktown Heights, New York.

Honors and awards
He received the John von Neumann Theory Prize in 1992, jointly with Alan Hoffman.

Selected publications

References

External Information 

INFORMS: Biography of Philip Wolfe from the Institute for Operations Research and the management Sciences

1927 births
2016 deaths
John von Neumann Theory Prize winners
American operations researchers
Numerical analysts
American computer scientists
20th-century American mathematicians
21st-century American mathematicians
American statisticians
RAND Corporation people
UC Berkeley College of Letters and Science alumni
Game theorists
Fellows of the Econometric Society